The Hainan yellow lantern chili, also known as the yellow emperor chili is a member of the Capsicum chinense species of chili peppers that grows mainly in the southwest and southeast of Hainan Island off the coast of Southern China.

Description and use

Most Hainan yellow lantern chili is processed into hot sauce.

Cultivars
In 2009, the Tropical Vegetable Research Centre of the Chinese Tropical Agriculture Institute  announced the breeding of a new cultivar that produces 10 times more fruit than the original variety.

References

External links
 

Chili peppers
Flora of China
Capsicum cultivars